Mala Abdullah Tutonji or Mufti Penjweni (موفتی پێنجوێنی in Kurdish), (1881 – 1952), was a Kurdish poet. Mufti was born in Penjwen in Iraqi Kurdistan.

References

1881 births
1952 deaths
Kurdish-language poets
Kurdish poets
People from Sulaymaniyah
Poets from the Ottoman Empire
Iraqi poets

ckb:موفتی پێنجوێنی